General elections were held in Trinidad and Tobago on 16 December 1991. The result was a victory for the People's National Movement, which won 21 of the 36 seats. Voter turnout was 65.5%.

Results

References

Trinidad
Elections in Trinidad and Tobago
1991 in Trinidad and Tobago